This article contains a list of fossil-bearing stratigraphic units in the state of New York, U.S.

Sites

See also

 Paleontology in New York

References

 

New York
Stratigraphic units
Stratigraphy of New York (state)
New York (state) geography-related lists
United States geology-related lists